Franklin Township is a township in Franklin County, Kansas, USA.  As of the 2000 census, its population was 2,552.  It is the most populated township in Franklin County.

Geography
According to the USGS, it contains one cemetery, Wellsville.

Fire District
On November 6, 2012, voters approved the creation of the Wellsville Fire District which combined the Franklin Township Fire Department and the City of Wellsville Fire Department.  The new fire district became fully operational on January 1, 2014.  The fire district board consists of the three members of the Franklin Township Board of Trustees and one member appointed by the City of Wellsville.

Transportation
Interstate 35 runs from the northeast to the southeast through Franklin Township. Kansas State Highway 33 runs north–south through Franklin Township.  Franklin Township contains one airport or landing strip, Qualls-Hart Airport.  A main line of the BNSF Railway runs through the middle of Franklin Township.

References
 USGS Geographic Names Information System (GNIS)

External links
 Franklin Township website
 City-Data.com

Townships in Franklin County, Kansas
Townships in Kansas